Brecon War Memorial Hospital is a health facility in Cerrigcochion Road, Brecon, Powys, Wales. It is managed by the Powys Teaching Health Board.

History
The facility was commissioned to replace the old Brecon Infirmary which was located on the north side of the Watton. It commemorated local soldiers who had died in the First World War and was officially opened as the Breconshire War Memorial Hospital by Lord Glanusk in January 1928. It joined the National Health Service in 1948. The Powys stroke rehabilitation unit moved to the hospital in February 2014.

References

Hospitals in Powys
Hospitals established in 1928
1928 establishments in Wales
Hospital buildings completed in 1928
NHS hospitals in Wales
Powys Teaching Health Board